Wayne Hughes may refer to:

People
Wayne Hughes (pastor), New Zealand pastor
Wayne Hughes (footballer) (born 1958), Welsh footballer
B. Wayne Hughes (1933–2021), American billionaire businessman
B. Wayne Hughes Jr. (born 1958/1959), American businessman

Fictional characters
Wayne Hughes (EastEnders), fictional character in British soap opera EastEnders